The 2nd Mirchi Music Awards, presented by the Radio Mirchi, honoured the best of Hindi music from the year 2009. The ceremony was held on 10 February 2010 at the Bandra Kurla Complex, Mumbai. There were many performances, including those by KK, Sunidhi Chauhan, Rekha Bhardwaj, Himesh Reshammiya, Usha Uthup, Shahid Kapoor and Katrina Kaif. A non-film category award was included for the first time. Delhi-6 won a leading eight awards including Album of the Year and Song of the Year for "Masakali". The show was broadcast on 21 February 2010 on Sony TV.

Winners and nominees 

The winners were selected by the members of jury, chaired by Javed Akhtar. The following are the names of winners.

Film awards

Technical awards

Special awards

Listeners' Choice awards

Films with multiple wins

Jury 
The jury was chaired by Javed Akhtar. Other members were:

 Aadesh Shrivastava - music composer and singer
 Alka Yagnik - playback singer
 Anu Malik - music director
 Lalit Pandit - composer
 Kailash Kher - singer
 Kavita Krishnamurthy - playback singer
 Louis Banks - composer, record producer and singer
 Prasoon Joshi - lyricist and screenwriter
 Rakeysh Omprakash Mehra - filmmaker and screenwriter
 Ramesh Sippy - director and producer
 Sadhana Sargam - playback singer
 Shankar Mahadevan - composer and playback singer
 Sukhwinder Singh - playback singer
 Suresh Wadkar - playback singer

See also 
 Mirchi Music Awards

References

External links 
 Music Mirchi Awards Official Website
 Music Mirchi Awards 2009

Mirchi Music Awards